Knut is a Scandinavian given name.

Knut, Knute, or Canute may also refer to:
Knut (band), a technical sludge metal band
Knut (polar bear) (2006–2011)
Knute Township, Minnesota
Canute, Oklahoma, United States
Knut, a fictional unit of Money in Harry Potter

See also
Knout, a heavy scourge-like multiple whip
Knuth (disambiguation), a name of Nordic origin
Kyiv National University of Trade and Economics (KNUTE)